The San Antonio Missions are a World Heritage Site located in and near San Antonio, Texas, United States. The World Heritage Site consists of five mission sites, a historic ranch, and related properties. These outposts were established by Catholic religious orders to spread Christianity among the local natives. These missions formed part of a colonization system that stretched across the Spanish Southwest in the 17th, 18th, and 19th centuries.

They were inscribed on the World Heritage List in 2015. Their architectural designs combine Spanish and Coahuiltecan cultures, including Catholic symbols and indigenous designs. They also process the remains of water distribution systems, that shows the combination of the indigenous and colonizers cultures.

List of the sites

See also

San Antonio Missions National Historical Park
List of World Heritage Sites in the United States
List of World Heritage Sites in North America
Spanish missions in the Americas

References